Marianne Badrichani (Brault-Badrichani) is a Franco-British theatre maker, director, dramatist, producer and acting coach. She is based in London.

Career
With a background in film production in Paris, she trained at Royal Central School of Speech and Drama and began directing plays and immersive performances in London in 2000. Best known for directing new writing and her adaptations, she has worked with Katie Mitchell, the Young Vic, the National Theatre, Theatre503 and in the West End.

She is a member of the Cross Channel Theatre Group, an initiative launched by the Institut Francais du Royaume-Uni which promotes French new writing in the UK - she was also their resident artist between 2014 and 2016. In 2012, she started to direct shows in China where she took Cravate Club/Members Only by Fabrice Roger-Lacan then Trois Ruptures/Three Splits in May 2015 after a run at the Coronet Theatre.

In the last recent years, she has worked on a trilogy of new adaptations staging playwrights playfully discussing their work with the characters of their plays (Ionesco/Dinner at the Smiths) or with their muses (Sacha Guitry, Ma Fille et Moi). After a sell-out run in London in 2018, Sacha Guitry, Ma Fille et Moi returned to the Playground Theatre (Notting Hill, London) in January 2019. Her latest production is Je t'aime moi non plus/Texts by Moliere which has been presented to sell-out audiences in 2022 in London and in Edinburgh at the French Institute for Scotland.

She's an associate artist at Elephant and Castle's BOLD Theatre founded by Sarah Davey-Hull since 2020.

Productions

As director
Je t'aime moi non plus/Texts by Molière at Institut français du Royaume-Uni and Chelsea Theatre, Sacha Guitry, Ma Fille et Moi, Trois Ruptures/Three Splits by Rémi De Vos with Chris Campbell and Edith Vernes (Print Room, Chelsea Theatre and the Nine Theatre in Beijing), Members Only with Robert Bathurst and Nicholas Tennant (Trafalgar Studios and Oriental Palace in Beijing), The Little Black Book with Paul McGann and Susannah Harker and Three Women with Marcia Warren, Annie Firbank and Camilla Rutherford (both at Riverside Studios), The Match by Driss Ksikes at Gate Theatre for Nour Festival, Paris Calling New Writing (Royal National Theatre).

As translator or writer
The Season in the Congo for Joe Wright and the Young Vic, Dr Seuss' The Cat in the Hat for Katie Mitchell, Interiors for Vanishing Point (both at Theatre de la Ville, Paris).

Other work
She also teaches drama, run workshops about new writing, and is a member of the audition panel at the Royal Central School of Speech and Drama, London City University, Westminster School and the International School of Screen Acting.

References

External links
 Personal website 
 you're onto a memorable theatre experience... (James Hadley for the Big Idea)
 Trois Ruptures/Three Splits, The Print Room (Culture Whisper)
 Un Aide Memoire très Londonien (La Croix)

French theatre directors
Living people
Year of birth missing (living people)